The Lawson L-4 was the last in a series of Lawson biplane airliners designed and built by Alfred Lawson under the livery of the Lawson Airplane Company of Milwaukee, Wisconsin. The largest of the series, it was designed for long-distance flights. It was completed in 1920 but never flew, crashing on its initial takeoff.

Design and development
After Alfred Lawson completed his 2000-mile Lawson L-2 flight, the Lawson Airplane Company built the Lawson Midnight Liner for use on the night service between Chicago and New York.  The Midnight Liner was larger with three 400-hp Liberty engines – one on each wing and another in the nose. The airliner sported sleeping berths and a shower. It was his objective to produce large number of these aircraft to outfit his airline, but the 1920 recession deprived Lawson of the investment funds to meet payroll and other development expenses. The first and only Lawson Midnight Liner was completed on December 9, 1920. Bad weather, however, delayed its maiden flight. As Lawson's financial situation worsened, he decided to fly his new airliner from a space near the factory, rather than make a costly ground transport move to Hamilton Field (now Gen. Mitchell Field). The prepared strip was only about 300 feet long. Lawson finally gave the order to attempt flight on May 8. The aircraft did not clear an elm tree and crashed on takeoff. The pilots were unhurt but the airliner was never repaired.

Lawson had a 100-passenger, double-deck version on the drafting board, but the Lawson Midnight Liner was the last. The company folded in 1922, and the assets were auctioned off. The Lawson Air Liners are renowned due to their size (for the time) and the ambition of their flamboyant promoter.

Operators

Lawson Airplane Company

Specifications (L-4)

See also

References

External links

1920s United States airliners
Trimotors
L-4
Biplanes